The Entrepreneur is a 2011 Italian drama film directed by Giuliano Montaldo. The film premiered out of competition at the 2011 Rome Film Festival. It won three Italian Golden Globes for best film, cinematography and best music and the special jury prize to Pierfrancesco Favino. It was also nominated to four Nastro d'Argento Awards (for best script, best actress, best cinematography and best scenography).

Cast 

Pierfrancesco Favino: Nicola
Carolina Crescentini: Laura
Eduard Gabia : Gabriel
Francesco Scianna: Ferrero
Elena Di Cioccio: Marcella
Andrea Tidona: Barbera

See also   
 List of Italian films of 2011

References

External links

 

2011 films
Italian drama films
2011 drama films
Films set in Turin
Films about financial crises
2010s Italian films